The Ocqueoc River is stream in Presque Isle County in the northeastern part of the lower peninsula in the U.S. state of Michigan.

The word Ocqueoc comes from a French term meaning "crooked waters", which aptly describes the winding Ocqueoc River.

Description and course 
The Ocqueoc River is the largest river entirely within Presque Isle County and drains several lakes, including Ocqueoc Lake, and receives a few tributaries, the largest being the Little Ocqueoc River and Silver Creek.

The falls and the Ocqueoc Falls Bicentennial Pathway, which offers groomed winter trails and summer hiking trails, are a tourist attraction of Presque Isle County. The Ocqueoc River is one of the few rivers in the Lower Peninsula to flow north.

The Ocqueoc River flows through a limestone karst region, and some of its tributaries, notably the Little Ocqueoc, are not continuous on the surface but flow through subterranean systems for part of their course. The upper reaches of the river's watershed is swampy with cedar, tamarack, balsam, poplar, aspen and black ash common. The warmer upper ranges have more warm-water fish including sunfish, pike and bass, while the lower cooler part of the river has salmon and trout. Smelt dipping is a style of fishing used near the mouth of the Ocqueoc.

Drainage basin 

The Ocqueoc River drainage basin includes all or portions of the following townships and municipalities in Presque Isle County:
 Bearinger Township
Bismarck Township
 Case Township
 Millersburg
 Moltke Township
 Ocqueoc Township

A very small portion of the watershed is located in northern Montmorency County but contains no surface water.

Named tributaries 
Named waterbodies with direct surface flow into the Ocqueoc River system, from the mouth:
 Ocqueoc Lake
 (right) Orchard Lake
 Mud Lake
 (left) Silver Creek
 (left) Little Ocqueoc River
 (right) Fox Creek
 (left) Indian Creek
 Upper Barnhart Lake
 (right) McIntosh Lake
 Lower Barnhart Lake
 (left) Mud Lake
 Lake Nettie
 (left) Bullhead Lake
 (right) Lake Ann
 (left) Horseshoe Lake
 (right) Lake Emma
 Moores Lake
 (right) Marl Bed Lake

References

External links
Minor WaterFalls, Great Lakes Waterfalls

Rivers of Presque Isle County, Michigan
Rivers of Michigan
Tributaries of Lake Huron